Grape coral may refer to two different species of sea anemone:

 Euphyllia cristata, found in the Indo-Pacific Ocean area
 Plerogyra sinuosa, found in the western Indian Ocean and the Red Sea